Genoa Racing may refer to:

 , active 1985–1988
 , a motor racing team that competed in the American Le Mans Series and European Le Mans Series class Le Mans Prototype Challenge
 O2 Racing Technology, also known as Genoa Racing/Genoa Lights/Genoa Indy Lights, a motor racing team that competed in the Indy Lights series